Ingrid – Die Geschichte eines Fotomodells is a German comedy film from 1955, directed by Géza von Radványi, written by Gerda Corbett, starring Johanna Matz, Paul Hubschmid and Louis de Funès.

Cast 
 Johanna Matz as Ingrid
 Paul Hubschmid as Robert, journalist
 Louis de Funès as D'Arrigio, fashion designer
 Erni Mangold as Ingrid's sister "Hanne"
 Joseph Offenbach as Mr Moga
 Paul Edwin Roth as Walter, press photographer
 Franz Schafheithin as headmistress of a school for models
 Alice Treff as the female director
 Jens Andersen
 Horst Beck
 Isolde Bräuner as a model
 Elly Brugmer as Ingrid's aunt
 Mickael Burk
 Marion Carr
 Gerda Corbett
 Georg Edert
 Hans Friedrich
 Harry Gondi
 Linda Geiser

References

External links 
 
 Ingrid – Die Geschichte eines Fotomodells (1955) at the Films de France

1955 comedy films
1955 films
Films directed by Géza von Radványi
German black-and-white films
German comedy films
1950s German-language films
West German films
Films about modeling
1950s German films